Henry St Clair or Sinclair, may relate to the following people:

Henry I St Clair of Herdmanston 12th century Scottish noble 
Henry St Clair, 7th Baron of Roslin 13th-14th Scottish baron
Henry I Sinclair, Earl of Orkney
Henry II Sinclair, Earl of Orkney
Henry Sinclair, 4th Lord Sinclair
Henry Sinclair, 6th Lord Sinclair
Henry Sinclair, 7th Lord Sinclair